is a 2007 sports video game  developed by Camelot and published by Capcom for the Wii. The game was worldwide in 2008.

Gameplay
We Love Golf! is played by swinging the Wii Remote like a golf club. There are numerous courses in the game, including a beach resort and a desert ruin, as well as courses based around pirate and candy themes.

The game allows players to use Mii avatars as playable characters. In addition, a number of Capcom costumes can be unlocked, including ones based on Ace Attorney characters Pearl Fey and Apollo Justice.

The European, North American and Australian releases of the game also feature online play via the Nintendo Wi-Fi Connection.

Reception

We Love Golf! received "generally favorable" reviews, according to review aggregator Metacritic.  In Japan, Famitsu gave it a score of one nine, one eight, one seven, and one eight, for a total of 32 out of 40.

References

External links
Official website 

2007 video games
Camelot Software Planning games
Capcom games
Golf video games
Nintendo Wi-Fi Connection games
Video games developed in Japan
Video games scored by Motoi Sakuraba
Wii-only games
Wii Wi-Fi games